Beclean (Hungarian and German: Bethlen) is a town in Bistrița-Năsăud County, in north-eastern Transylvania, Romania. The town administers three villages: Coldău (Goldau; Várkudu), Figa (Füge), and Rusu de Jos (Alsóoroszfalu).

Geography
The town lies on the Transylvanian Plateau, at the confluence of the river Someșul Mare with its affluent, the Șieu.

History

The town of Beclean is the ancestral seat of the Hungarian Bethlen family.

In 1850 the inhabitants of the town were 1,475, of which 805 Romanians, 327 Hungarians, 163 Jews, 163 Roma, 5 Germans, and 12 of other ethnicities. Beclean had 10,628 inhabitants at the 2011 census; of those, 81.6% were Romanians, 14.2% Hungarians, and 3.7% Roma.

Transportation

Beclean is the site of an important railway junction (the train station is called Beclean pe Someș), where secondary routes to Sighetu Marmației and Suceava diverge from the main Căile Ferate Române railway line 400 from Brașov to Satu Mare.

Additionally, county road DJ172A connects it to Gherla in Cluj County, while road DJ172F provides an alternate route to Dej.

Education

Beclean is home to four high schools: the Petru Rareș National College, the Henri Coandă Technological High School, the Beclean Agricultural Technological High School, and High School Nr. 1. There is also a middle school, the Grigore Silași Gymnasium.

Natives
 (born 1968), theater director
Károly Bárányos (1892–1956), Hungarian politician
György Bernády (1864–1938), mayor of Târgu Mureș
Cornel Cornea (born 1981), footballer
Cristian Costin (born 1998), footballer
 (1836–1897), Greek Catholic priest and philologist
Aharon Ze'evi-Farkash (born 1948), Israeli general

References

External links

Populated places in Bistrița-Năsăud County
Localities in Transylvania
Towns in Romania
Monotowns in Romania
Shtetls